Ctenognathodus is an extinct conodont genus in the family Kockelellidae.

References

External links 

 Ctenognathodus at fossilworks.org (retrieved 3 May 2016)

Ozarkodinida genera